The qualifying competition for 2012 Men's European Water Polo Championship is a series of competitions to decide the qualifiers for 2012 Men's European Water Polo Championship.

System

Pre-qualified
 (hosts) 
 (Winners, 2010 Men's European Water Polo Championship) 
 (Finalists, 2010 Men's European Water Polo Championship) 
 (3rd Place, 2010 Men's European Water Polo Championship) 
 (4th Place, 2010 Men's European Water Polo Championship) 
 (5th Place, 2010 Men's European Water Polo Championship)

Draw

Groups

Group stage

Group A

Group B

Group C

Group D

Group E

Group F

Playoffs 
The playoffs were played home-and-away in October 2012, with the winner advancing on aggregate goals scored over the two legs. Each group winner was drawn against each group runner-up. The winners of the playoffs qualified for the 2012 Men's European Water Polo Championship.

|}

First leg

Second leg

References

Men
Men's European Water Polo Championship
Euro
Euro